WMPS (1210 AM) – branded as Sunny 103.1 – is a commercial adult standards radio station licensed to Bartlett, Tennessee. Owned by Flinn Broadcasting, the station serves the Memphis metropolitan area. In addition to a standard analog transmission, the station also simulcasts over Memphis low-power FM translator W276BH (103.1 FM) and streams online.

History
On August 19, 1986, the station signed on as WGSF in Arlington, Tennessee.  It was owned by the Arlington Broadcasting Company.  In the 1980s, Fred Flinn became the general manager of the station and would later acquire the station as part of his Flinn Broadcasting Corporation.  In the late 1980s, WGSF's city of license was switched to Bartlett, Tennessee.

Previously called "Music of Your Life", WMPS had an adult standards music format later switching to adult contemporary.

FM translator

References

External links

MPS
Bartlett, Tennessee